Birger Pedersen (1 December 1910 – 22 January 1969) was a Norwegian footballer. He played in two matches for the Norway national football team from 1934 to 1936. He was also part of Norway's squad for the football tournament at the 1936 Summer Olympics, but he did not play in any matches.

References

External links
 

1910 births
1969 deaths
Norwegian footballers
Norway international footballers
Place of birth missing
Association football forwards